Ryszard Marchlik (born 3 November 1939) is a Polish sprint canoer who competed in the 1960s. Competing in three Summer Olympics, he earned his best finish of fourth in the K-1 4 × 500 m event at Rome in 1960.

References
Sports-reference.com profile

1939 births
Canoeists at the 1960 Summer Olympics
Canoeists at the 1964 Summer Olympics
Canoeists at the 1968 Summer Olympics
Living people
Polish male canoeists
Olympic canoeists of Poland
People from Chełm
Sportspeople from Lublin Voivodeship